Martha Rogers may refer to:

Martha E. Rogers (1914–1994), American nurse, researcher, theorist and author
Martha Rogers (professor) (born 1955), American author and adjunct professor at Duke University
Mattie Rogers (Martha Ann Rogers, born 1995), American weightlifter

See also
Martha Rodgers, Castle character played by Susan Sullivan during 2009–2016